The Moreland M-1 was a 1929 American three-seat civil aircraft. Only four were built.

Design and development

The M-1 was the first aircraft built by Moreland aircraft, founded in 1928 and based at El Segundo, California. Led by G.E.Moreland and Orrin Moe, the design also contained Ed Heinemann's first contributions. It was a parasol wing aircraft with wings of rectangular plan apart from rounded tips and a central, trailing edge cut-out to enhance the pilot's field of view. They had wooden structures with spruce box-spars and ribs, were plywood-covered and braced to the fuselage by pairs of outward-leaning N-form struts between the mid- and lower longerons and the wing spars. These struts were quite short, reaching the wings at about 25% span. A cabane provided central wing support.

The M-1's nine cylinder Wright J-5 Whirlwind radial engine was nose-mounted, flown with or without a ring type engine cowling. The fuselage of the M-1 had a welded chrome-molybdenum steel tube structure, like many designs of the time, and was fabric-covered. Zips provided easy access to the rear control connections.  Two passengers sat side-by-side close to the wing underside at about mid-chord. They were protected by a large, V-shaped windscreen which projected forward of the leading edge to the engine mounting and rearwards to the hinge of a large access door. The pilot's well-instrumented cockpit was under the trailing edge cut-out, providing views both above and below the wing.

The M-1's vertical rear control surfaces were rather straight and upright, though the balanced rudder was round-tipped. Its tailplane, mounted on top of the fuselage, was adjustable and wire-braced to the fin.

The undercarriage was a split axle design, with the axles hinged from the fuselage central underside. Near-vertical Aerol shock absorber legs were fuselage-mounted at the base of the forward wing struts and drag struts reached rearwards to the lower fuselage.

Operational history

The M-1 first flew in 1929, though the exact date is not known, and received its type certificate in September. It featured at the Cleveland Air Show held in the autumn of 1929. Only four were built.

Specifications

References

Parasol-wing aircraft
Single-engined tractor aircraft
1920s United States aircraft
United States sport aircraft
Aircraft first flown in 1929